Vision 2030 may refer to:

 Abu Dhabi Vision 2030, a set of strategic policies for the development of the Emirate
Egypt Vision 2030, a strategic national agenda to achieve sustainable development
 Kenya Vision 2030, a medium-term development programme
 Qatar National Vision 2030, a plan to enable sustainable development
 Saudi Vision 2030, a plan to reduce the country's dependence on oil